Harbor Road was a station on the abandoned North Shore Branch of the Staten Island Railway in Mariners Harbor, Staten Island, New York. The station, located under the overpass at the highest point of Harbor Road, was built in an open-cut with two tracks and one island platform. The station was opened during the SIRT grade crossing elimination project of 1935 – 1937. It closed on March 31, 1953, along with the South Beach Branch and the rest of the North Shore Branch. The station was demolished in 2004 during a reconstruction of the rail system for reactivated freight service by the nearby Howland Hook Marine Terminal.

References

 https://web.archive.org/web/20150108175705/http://stationreporter.net/nshore.htm
 http://gretschviking.net/GOSIRTNorthShore.htm

North Shore Branch stations
Railway stations closed in 1953
1953 disestablishments in New York (state)